Dameon Venter (born 10 December 1999) is a South African rugby union player for the  in the Currie Cup. His regular position is hooker.

Venter was named in the  side for the 2022 Currie Cup Premier Division.

References

South African rugby union players
Living people
Rugby union hookers
Lions (United Rugby Championship) players
Golden Lions players
1999 births
Tel Aviv Heat players
South African expatriate sportspeople in Israel
South African expatriate rugby union players
Expatriate rugby union players in Israel